Lins is a municipality in the western part of the state of São Paulo in Brazil. The population is 78,503 (2020 est.) in an area of 570 km2. The elevation is 437 m. Distance is 455 km from the state capital, São Paulo.

History

The town was founded in the beginning of the 20th century, at first with the name of Santo Antônio do Campestre, and grew after the arrival of the Estrada de Ferro Noroeste do Brasil (The Northwest railroad of Brazil). It became an independent municipality in 1920, when it was separated from the municipality Pirajuí. It was named after Manoel Joaquim de Albuquerque Lins, who was the president of the state of São Paulo from 1908 to 1912. The name was officially changed from Albuquerque Lins to Lins in 1926.

The city is served by Gov. Lucas Nogueira Garcez Airport.

Demography

2000 census

total population: 65.952

 urban: 64.218
 Rural: 1.734
 men: 31.990
 women: 33.962
 population density (inhabitants/km2): 115,42
 child mortality (per thousands): 11,79
 life expectance (years): 73,56
 birth rate (per woman): 1,97
 literacy rate: 92,48%

human development index (HDI-M): 0,724

 HDI-M Renda: 0,782
 HDI-M Longevidade: 0,809
 HDI-M Education: 0,791

(source: IPEADATA)

References

 
Populated places established in 1920